Dun Glacier is a short, steep tributary to the Ferrar Glacier in Victoria Land. It descends the southern side of the Kukri Hills midway between Mount Coates and Sentinel Peak. It was named by the Western Journey Party led by Griffith Taylor of the British Antarctic Expedition, 1910–13, under Robert Falcon Scott.

References 

Glaciers of Victoria Land
Scott Coast